Queensway Stadium is an athletics stadium in Wrexham, Wales, which is home to the Wrexham Athletics Club and until 2021 North Wales Crusaders rugby league club.

North Wales Crusaders moved to the stadium from the Racecourse Ground for the 2017 rugby league season, until moving to the Eirias Stadium, Colwyn Bay in 2021.

References

External links 
 Queensway Stadium

Athletics (track and field) venues in Wales
Rugby league stadiums in Wales
Sport in Wrexham
Multi-purpose stadiums in the United Kingdom
North Wales Crusaders